The Body Chemistry film series is a series of four films that focus on sexy, psychotic psychiatrist Dr. Claire Archer. The character was inspired by the one played by Glenn Close in Fatal Attraction.

Body ChemistryBody Chemistry is a 1990 American drama film directed by Kristine Peterson.

It led to a series of sequels.

Plot
Two university academics study sexuality.

Cast
 Marc Singer as Tom Redding
 Lisa Pescia as Dr. Claire Archer
 Mary Crosby as Marlee Redding
 David Kagen as Freddie

Body Chemistry II: The Voice of a Stranger

 Body Chemistry II: The Voice of a Stranger is a 1991 film.

Cast
 Gregory Harrison as Dan Pearson
 Lisa Pescia as Dr. Claire Archer
 Morton Downey Jr. as Chuck "Big Chuck" 
 Robin Riker as Brenda
 Clint Howard as Larabee

Point of Seduction: Body Chemistry III

Point of Seduction: Body Chemistry III is a 1994 American erotic thriller film.

Plot
Movie producer Andrew Clay wants to make a film about Dr. Claire Archer, a psychologist who appears on television. Two men have died because of their obsession with her.

Clay falls for the psychologist. The screenwriter of the proposed film begins to suspect she might be more guilty than everyone thinks. Matters are complicated when Clay's wife wants to play the psychologist in the film.

Cast
 Andrew Stevens as Alan Clay
 Morgan Fairchild
 Robert Forster
 Chick Vennera
 Shari Shattuck as Dr. Claire Archer
 Stella Stevens

Body Chemistry IV: Full Exposure

Body Chemistry IV: Full Exposure is a 1995 film, the final film in the series. It was directed by Jim Wynorski, who plays a small role as a judge.

Plot
Dr. Claire Archer is accused of the murder of producer Andrew Clay. She hires a lawyer to defend her.

Cast
 Shannon Tweed as Dr. Claire Archer
 Larry Poindexter
 Stella Stevens
 Andrew Stevens
 Jim Wynorski as Judge

References

External links 

Body Chemistry at TCMDB
Body Chemistry II: The Voice of a Stranger at IMDb
Point of Seduction: Body Chemistry III at IMDb
Body Chemistry IV: Full Exposure at IMDb

1990 drama films
American thriller films
Films directed by Jim Wynorski
1990s English-language films
1990s American films